Šegova Vas ( or ;) is a village in the Municipality of Loški Potok in southern Slovenia. The entire municipality is part of the traditional region of Lower Carniola and is now included in the Southeast Slovenia Statistical Region.

References

External links
Šegova Vas on Geopedia

Populated places in the Municipality of Loški Potok